Simsbury High School (SHS) is a public high school in Simsbury, Connecticut.

Athletics
Simsbury has been honored multiple times with the Achievement Cup for outstanding achievement in athletics in the state of Connecticut.

Crew
The Crew program rows out of Paine Boathouse on the Farmington River.

Accomplishments

New England Championships:

-First Girls in 1980, 1982;

-Second Girls 1981, 1983, 1984,

-Third Girls 1978, 1982

-Third Boys 1987

Soccer

Boy's
Class Championships
 1981 LL (co-champions with Staples High School) 
 1992 LL
 2003 LL (co-champions with Glastonbury High School)
 2006 LL

Girl's
Class Championships
 1982 LL
 1983 LL
 1987 LL
 1992 LL
 1994 LL
 2000 LL
 2005 LL (co-champions with Cheshire High School)

Wrestling
Class Championships
 1992 LL
 1995 L
 1997 L

Notable alumni 

 Tommy Cross, professional ice hockey player for the Springfield Thunderbirds, attended from 2004-2006
 Justin Foley, drummer for metalcore band Killswitch Engage, graduated in 1994.
 Sara Hendershot, member of 2012 United States Olympic Rowing Team (W2-), graduated in 2006.
 Carl Nichols, United States District Judge of the United States District Court for the District of Columbia, graduated in 1988.
 Ken Richters, stage actor, playwright, and voice actor, graduated in 1974.
 Franz von Holzhausen, designer of Tesla Model S and head designer at Tesla, Inc., graduated in 1986.
 Jennifer Weiner, author of Good in Bed and In Her Shoes, graduated in 1987.

References

External links
 

Buildings and structures in Simsbury, Connecticut
Schools in Hartford County, Connecticut
Public high schools in Connecticut